The SCW World Tag Team Championship was the top tag team championship in Southwest Championship Wrestling from its establishment in 1980 until 1984, when the title was abandoned.

History

References

External links
 SWCW World Tag Team title history

World Tage Team Championship
Tag team wrestling championships